The Dutch Eredivisie in the 1967–68 season was contested by 18 teams. Ajax won the championship. This season, no teams relegated, due to bankruptcy of Xerxes/DHC and a merger between Fortuna '54 and Sittardia into Fortuna Sittardia Combinatie (or Fortuna SC).

Teams

A total of 18 teams are taking part in the league.

League standings

Results

See also 
 1967–68 Eerste Divisie
 1967–68 Tweede Divisie

References 

 Eredivisie official website - info on all seasons 
 RSSSF

Eredivisie seasons
Netherlands
1967–68 in Dutch football